Jhr. Dr. Ernst Vegelin van Claerbergen (born 10 September 1969, Arnhem) is Head of the Courtauld Gallery, London.

Selected publications
David Teniers and the theatre of painting. London: Courtauld Institute of Art, 2006. (Editor) 
Renoir at the theatre: looking at La loge. London: Courtauld Gallery in association with Paul Holberton Pub., 2008. (Editor)

References

External links
Introduction to the Courtauld Gallery by Dr. Vegelin.

1969 births
Living people
Dutch art historians
Directors of museums in the United Kingdom
People from Arnhem
Academics of the Courtauld Institute of Art
Alumni of the Courtauld Institute of Art
Trinity College (Connecticut) alumni
Dutch nobility

nl:Ernst Vegelin van Claerbergen